Tamaz (Temur) Stepania (born 28 September 1950 in Bolnisi; died 28 March 1972 in Gori) was a Georgian and Soviet football player.

Stepania died in a car accident at the age of 21.

Tamaz Stepania Stadium in his hometown Bolnisi is named after him.

References

External links
  Dinamo Tbilisi Profile
  Footballfacts Profile

1950 births
1972 deaths
Soviet footballers
Footballers from Georgia (country)
Association football goalkeepers
FC Dinamo Tbilisi players
Soviet Top League players
Road incident deaths in the Soviet Union
People from Kvemo Kartli